Death Over Shanghai is a 1932 German thriller film directed by Rolf Randolf and starring Gerda Maurus, Else Elster and Theodor Loos. The Chinese Ministry of Education requested that the German government have the film destroyed because they had received reports that it "ridiculed China and the Chinese people".

The film's sets were designed by the art director Heinrich Richter. Location filming took place on the Halligen of the North Sea.

Cast
 Gerda Maurus as Praxa, Besitzerin des Teehauses zur 'Mohnblüte'
 Else Elster as Maud - Gouverneurs Tochter
 Theodor Loos as James Biggers
 Peter Voß as John Baxter
 Max Ralph-Ostermann as Gouverneur Harris
 Robert Eckert as Mac Hover amerik. Marine-Attaché
 Ernst Pröckl as William - Biggers Sekretär
 Georg John as Lutsin - Praxas Diener
 Mammey Terja-Basa as Baxters Gehilfe
 Aruth Wartan as Corner
 Otto Kronburger as Kommandant der 'Washington'
 Fritz Alberti as Dr. Brown, Polizeichef
 Egon Kaiser as Kapellmeister & sein Orchester

References

Bibliography
  - Read online, registration required

External links

1932 films
German thriller films
1930s German-language films
Films directed by Rolf Randolf
Films set in Shanghai
Films of the Weimar Republic
German black-and-white films
1930s thriller films
1930s German films